Germi is a city in Ardabil Province, Iran.

Germi or Garmi may also refer to:
 Garmi Angut, Ardabil Province
 Garmi, Kerman
 Garmi, Kermanshah
 Germi County, in Ardabil Province